Adventures with Barbie: Ocean Discovery is a 1997 video game developed by Gorilla Systems Corporation and published by Vivendi Universal Interactive Publishing International for Windows. On the Game Boy Color, the game was known as Barbie: Ocean Discovery.

It was Mattel Media's first adventure game featuring the character Barbie. The game's success in the market led to Mattel Media producing further girl's games over the next few years.

In a promo with Coca-Cola for its line of Barbie Software Products for Girls during the holiday season and into 1998, Mattel Media arranged a $5 coupon for Adventures with Barbie Ocean Discovery and Barbie Magic Hair Styler inside 12- and 24-packs of Coca-Cola "Santa Packs."

Plot and gameplay 
The PC and GBC versions were slightly different; for instance, the dolphin plays a more significant role in Windows than it does on the Game Boy Color version.

Critical reception 
Entertainment Weekly felt the game was "underwhelming". The New York Times thought the game's mentions of Barbie's marine biology degree was a "nod toward enlightenment" for the girl's game genre, while From Barbie to Mortal Kombat: Gender and Computer Games thought the game saw the series branching out from the "true pink fluff" exemplified in titles like Barbie Fashion Designer. French reviewer PVG24 felt the game successfully penetrated the local market.

References

External links 

 https://www.latimes.com/archives/la-xpm-1997-oct-27-fi-47211-story.html 
 https://apnews.com/article/efe0eaed57d7dfa1b0ab095bc19471ef

1997 video games
Adventure games
Barbie video games
Game Boy Color games
Video games developed in the United States
Windows games
Gorilla Systems games